Alexander Sargent (9 May 1895 – 5 January 1989) was an eminent Anglican clergyman in the mid 20th century.

He was born on 9 May 1895,  educated at The King's School, Canterbury and St Edmund Hall, Oxford and ordained in 1920. After curacies at St Margaret's at Cliffe and Maidstone he became Chaplain of Ripon College Cuddesdon. He was then Sub-Warden of St Paul's College, Grahamstown and after that Resident Chaplain to the Archbishop of Canterbury.  In 1939 he was appointed Archdeacon of Maidstone and in 1942 Archdeacon of Canterbury. He retired in 1968 and died on 5 January 1989.

References

1895 births
1989 deaths
People educated at The King's School, Canterbury
Alumni of St Edmund Hall, Oxford
Alumni of Ripon College Cuddesdon
Archdeacons of Canterbury
Archdeacons of Maidstone
Academic staff of St Paul's College, Grahamstown